A tomb effigy, usually a recumbent effigy or, in French, gisant (French, "lying"), is a sculpted figure on a tomb monument depicting in effigy the deceased. These compositions were developed in Western Europe in the Middle Ages, and continued in use through the Renaissance and early modern period; they are still sometimes used. They typically represent the deceased in a state of "eternal repose", lying with hands folded in prayer and awaiting resurrection. A husband and wife may be depicted lying side by side. An important official or leader may be shown holding his attributes of office or dressed in the formal attire of his official status or social class.

The life-size recumbent effigy was first found in the tombs of royalty and senior clerics, and then spread to the nobility. A particular type of late medieval effigy was the transi, or cadaver monument, in which the effigy is in the macabre form of a decomposing corpse, or such a figure lies on a lower level, beneath a more conventional effigy. In the same period small figures of mourners called weepers or pleurants were added below the effigy to important tombs.  In the Early Modern period European effigies are often shown as alive, and either kneeling or in a more active pose, especially for military figures.  During the Renaissance, other non-recumbent types of effigy became more popular. Variations showed the deceased lying on their side as if reading, kneeling in prayer and even standing. The recumbent effigy had something of a vogue during the Gothic revival period of the 19th century, especially for bishops and other clerics.  Many graves at Monument Cemetery in Milan have recumbent figures.

Some of the best-known examples of the form are in Westminster Abbey in London, Saint Peter's in Rome, Santi Giovanni e Paolo, Venice (twenty-five Doges), and the Basilica of Santa Croce, Florence.

A celebrated poem describing and reflecting on a pair of stone effigies is An Arundel Tomb by Philip Larkin.

History

Ancient precursors
Recumbent effigies were a common tradition in Etruscan funerary art, examples are known in both ceramic and stone. The deceased was typically depicted alive as at a feast, lying sideways, propped up on one arm and sometimes holding a cup.  Usually these were rather smaller than life-size.  The Romans continued this tradition, though they also created many other types of funerary effigy. Their faces are often clearly portraits of individuals.

Medieval
The first medieval gisants emerged in the 12th century. They were executed in low relief, and were horizontal, but appeared as in life. The faces were generalized rather than portraits. Gradually these became full high-relief effigies, usually recumbent, as in death, and, by the 14th century, with hands together in prayer. In general, such monumental effigies were carved in stone, marble or wood, or cast in bronze or brass. Often the stone effigies were painted to simulate life, but in the majority of the medieval monuments, this has long since disappeared. The cross-legged attitude of many English armoured figures of the late 13th or early 14th centuries was long supposed to imply that the deceased had served in the Crusades, had taken crusading vows, or more specifically had been a Knight Templar; but these theories are now rejected by scholars.

By the early 13th century, effigies began to be raised on tomb-style chests (known as tomb chests or altar tombs) decorated with foliage, heraldry or architectural detailing. Soon such chests also stood alone with varying degrees of decoration. By the end of the century, these often had architectural canopies and figured "weepers" or "mourners" — representing friends or relatives and identified by their coats of arms — were popular decorative features.

In Britain the "large-scale production of military effigies" began in the middle of the 13th century, as the result of the "emergence of a new patron class" of knights, who were fewer in number but wealthier than before.

Another late medieval fashion was to show the person in an advanced state of decomposition, perhaps as a secondary effigy. This type of tomb is known as a transi.

Later
In Spain the iconography of Christ lying ('Cristo yacente'), as though an effigy, was very popular until the late 18th century. One of the famous sculptors known for this iconography was Gregorio Fernández, see Cristo Yacente of El Pardo.

A late example of a stone effigy is that of T. E. Lawrence ("Lawrence of Arabia", d. 1935) by Eric Kennington, in St Martin's Church, Wareham, Dorset, installed in 1939.

Another example is the effigy of Aubrey Herbert (d. 1923) in the Church of St Nicholas, Brushford in Somerset.

References

Sources

 Smith, Jeffrey Chipps. The Northern Renaissance (Art and Ideas). London: Phaidon Press, 2004. 
 Panofsky, Irvin. Tomb Sculpture. London: Harry Abrams, 1964. 
 Stone, Lawrence, Sculpture in Britain: The Middle Ages, 1972 (2nd edn.), Penguin Books (now Yale History of Art)
 Tummers, H. A., Early Secular Effigies in England: The Thirteenth Century, 1980, Brill Archive, google books

Types of sculpture
Types of monuments and memorials
Burial monuments and structures
Funerary art
Sculpture